Serine/threonine-protein phosphatase 2B catalytic subunit alpha isoform (PP2BA) is a protein that in humans is encoded by the PPP3CA gene.

References

Further reading